Abiotic is an American deathcore band from Miami formed in 2010. The band released two full-length albums on Metal Blade Records, Symbiosis in 2012 and Casuistry in 2015. The band broke up in 2016, citing financial issues and internal problems within the group as reasons for the breakup. In 2018, the band reunited, and in 2019, released a new single: "Emerald".

Members
Current members

 Matt Mendez – guitar (2010–2016, 2018–present)
 Johnathon Matos – guitar (2010–2016, 2018–present)
 Travis Bartosek – vocals (2014–2016, 2018–present)
 Killan Duarte – bass (2018–present)
 Anthony Lusk-Simone - drums (2019–present)
 Sam Bailey - vocals (2022-present)
Past members

 Alex Vasquez – bass (2010–2016)
 Andres Hurtado – drums (2010–2013)
 Ray Jiminez – vocals (2010–2013)
 Dickie Allen – vocals (2013–2014)
 Brent Phillips – drums (2014–2016)
 Aaron Stechauner - drums (2014-2016, 2018-2019)

Past live musicians

 Matthew Paulazzo – drums (2016)

Discography 

 A Universal Plague EP (2011, self-released)
 Symbiosis (2012, Metal Blade)
 Casuistry (2015, Metal Blade)
 Emerald (single, 2019)
 Ikigai (2021, The Artisan Era)

References

External links 
 Facebook
 Twitter
 Instagram

American deathcore musical groups
Musical groups established in 2010
Musical groups disestablished in 2016
Musical groups reestablished in 2018
Musical groups from Florida
Musical groups from Miami
Deathcore musical groups
Metal Blade Records artists
2010 establishments in Florida